Yitzhak Shimon Wasserlauf (born 14 August 1992) is an Israeli politician and activist who serves the Minister for the Development of the Periphery, the Negev and the Galilee and as a member of Knesset for Otzma Yehudit following the 2022 Israeli legislative election.

Political career
Wasserlauf was elected to the Knesset as part of the joint Religious Zionist Party-Otzma Yehudit list in the 2022 Israeli legislative election. On 29 December 2022, Wasserlauf was appointed Minister for the Development of the Periphery, the Negev and the Galilee in the new government.

References

1992 births
Living people
Members of the 25th Knesset (2022–)
Otzma Yehudit politicians